Rodney Lee Lindsey (born January 28, 1976) is a former outfielder in Major League Baseball. He played for the Detroit Tigers.

References

External links

1976 births
Living people
Major League Baseball outfielders
Detroit Tigers players
Baseball players from Alabama
Bridgeport Bluefish players
People from Opelika, Alabama